The 1978 Asian Basketball Confederation Championship for Women were held in Kuala Lumpur, Malaysia.

Results

Final standing

Awards

References
 Results
 archive.fiba.com

1978
1978 in women's basketball
women
International women's basketball competitions hosted by Malaysia
B